The Dizzy Gillespie Reunion Big Band (subtitled 20th and 30th Anniversary) is a live album by trumpeter Dizzy Gillespie that was recorded at the Berlin Jazz Festival in 1968 and  released by  MPS.

Reception
The Allmusic review stated "This little-known LP actually contains one of Dizzy Gillespie's greatest performances of the 1960s... Although already 51, the trumpeter is heard at his best on this hard-to-find but essential LP".

Track listing
 "Things to Come" (Dizzy Gillespie, Gil Fuller) - 5:29
 "One Bass Hit" (Gillespie, Fuller) - 6:35
 "Frisco" (Mike Longo) - 7:55
 "Con Alma" (Gillespie) - 10:15
 "The Things Are Here" (Gillespie) - 7:40
 "Theme - Birks' Works" (Gillespie, Barney Kessel) - 1:40

Personnel
 Dizzy Gillespie – trumpet
 Stu Hamer – trumpet
 Jimmy Owens – trumpet
 Victor Paz – trumpet
 Dizzy Reece – trumpet
 Curtis Fuller – trombone
 Ted Kelly – trombone
 Tom McIntosh – trombone
 James Moody – alto saxophone, tenor saxophone
 Sahib Shihab – alto saxophone, baritone saxophone
 Chris Woods – alto saxophone
 Paul Jeffrey – tenor saxophone
 Cecil Payne – baritone saxophone
 Mike Longo – piano
 Paul West – double bass
 Otis Finch – drums

References 

MPS Records live albums
Dizzy Gillespie live albums
1968 live albums
Albums produced by Joachim-Ernst Berendt